Swainsona galegifolia commonly known as smooth Darling pea, is a species of flowering plant in the family Fabaceae and is endemic to Australia. It is a small shrub with greyish-green leaves and flowers in white, red, pink, purple, yellow or orange.

Description
The calyx is smooth, shorter than the floral tube.

Taxonomy and naming
The species was first formally described in 1803 by Henry Cranke Andrews as Vicia galegifolia. In 1812 Robert Brown changed the name to Swainsona galegifolia and the change was published in Hortus Kewensis. The specific epithet (galegifolia) refers to the similarity to the northern hemisphere plant galega.

Distribution and habitat
Smooth Darling pea is a widespread species growing in several different habitats in New South Wales, Victoria and Queensland.

References 

galegifolia
Fabales of Australia
Flora of New South Wales
Flora of Queensland
Flora of Victoria (Australia)
Taxa named by Henry Cranke Andrews